

Ba

 Louis François Georges Baby b. 1834 first elected in 1872 as Conservative member for Joliette, Quebec.
 André Bachand b. 1934   first elected in 1980 as Liberal member for Missisquoi, Quebec.
 André Bachand b. 1961   first elected in 1997 as Progressive Conservative member for Richmond—Arthabaska, Quebec.
 Claude Bachand b. 1951   first elected in 1993 as Bloc Québécois member for Saint-Jean, Quebec.
 Taylor Bachrach first elected in 2019 as New Democratic Party member for Skeena—Bulkley Valley, British Columbia.
 Hubert Badanai b. 1895   first elected in 1958 as Liberal member for Fort William, Ontario.
 Vance Badawey b. 1964 first elected in 2015 as Liberal member for Niagara Centre, Ontario.
 Larry Bagnell b. 1949   first elected in 2000 as Liberal member for Yukon, Yukon.
 Roy Bailey b. 1928   first elected in 1997 as Reform member for Souris—Moose Mountain, Saskatchewan.
 James William Bain b. 1838 first elected in 1883 as Conservative member for Soulanges, Quebec.
 Thomas Bain b. 1834 first elected in 1872 as Liberal member for Wentworth North, Ontario.
 Navdeep Singh Bains b. 1977 first elected in 2004 as Liberal member for Mississauga—Brampton South, Ontario.
 Parm Bains first elected in 2021 as Liberal member for Steveston—Richmond East, British Columbia. 
 George Frederick Baird b. 1851 first elected in 1887 as Conservative member for Queen's, New Brunswick.
 John Baird b. 1969 first elected in 2006 as Conservative member for Ottawa West—Nepean
 Edgar Crow Baker b. 1845 first elected in 1882 as Conservative member for Victoria, British Columbia.
 George Barnard Baker b. 1834 first elected in 1870 as Liberal-Conservative member for Missisquoi, Quebec.
 George Harold Baker b. 1877   first elected in 1911 as Conservative member for Brome, Quebec.
 George Baker b. 1942   first elected in 1974 as Liberal member for Gander—Twillingate, Newfoundland and Labrador.
 Loran Ellis Baker b. 1905   first elected in 1945 as Liberal member for Shelburne—Yarmouth—Clare, Nova Scotia.
 Richard Langton Baker b. 1870 first elected in 1925 as Conservative member for Toronto Northeast, Ontario.
 Walter Baker b. 1930   first elected in 1972 as Progressive Conservative member for Grenville—Carleton, Ontario.
 Yvan Baker b. 1977 first elected in 2019 as Liberal member for Etobicoke Centre, Ontario. 
 Eleni Bakopanos b. 1954   first elected in 1993 as Liberal member for Saint-Denis, Quebec.
 Léon Balcer b. 1917   first elected in 1949 as Progressive Conservative member for Trois-Rivières, Quebec.
 Samuel Rosborough Balcom b. 1888   first elected in 1950 as Liberal member for Halifax, Nova Scotia.
 Tony Baldinelli first elected in 2019 as Conservative member for Niagara Falls, Ontario. 
 Ged Baldwin b. 1907   first elected in 1958 as Progressive Conservative member for Peace River, Alberta.
 Willis Keith Baldwin b. 1857 first elected in 1917 as Laurier Liberal member for Stanstead, Quebec.
 James Balfour b. 1928   first elected in 1972 as Progressive Conservative member for Regina East, Saskatchewan.
 Georges Ball b. 1838 first elected in 1900 as Conservative member for Nicolet, Quebec.
 Robert James Ball b. 1857 first elected in 1911 as Conservative member for Grey South, Ontario.
 Charles Ballantyne b. 1867 first elected in 1917 as Unionist member for St. Lawrence—St. George, Quebec.
 Harold Raymond Ballard b. 1918   first elected in 1965 as Progressive Conservative member for Calgary South, Alberta.
 Leland Payson Bancroft b. 1880   first elected in 1921 as Progressive member for Selkirk, Manitoba.
 Andrew Graham Ballenden Bannatyne b. 1829 first elected in 1875 as Liberal member for Provencher, Manitoba.
 William Bannerman b. 1841 first elected in 1878 as Conservative member for Renfrew South, Ontario.
 Harry James Barber b. 1875   first elected in 1925 as Conservative member for Fraser Valley, British Columbia.
 Charles-Noël Barbès b. 1914   first elected in 1957 as Liberal member for Chapleau, Quebec.
 Vivian Barbot first elected in 2006 as Bloc Québécois member for Papineau
 Jean Louis Baribeau b. 1893   first elected in 1930 as Conservative member for Champlain, Quebec.
 Frederick Eustace Barker b. 1838 first elected in 1885 as Conservative member for City of St. John, New Brunswick.
 Samuel Barker b. 1839 first elected in 1900 as Conservative member for Hamilton, Ontario.
 John Barlow b. 1971 first elected in 2014 as Conservative member for Macleod, Alberta. 
 Francis Jones Barnard b. 1829 first elected in 1879 as Conservative member for Yale, British Columbia.
 Frank Stillman Barnard b. 1856 first elected in 1888 as Conservative member for Cariboo, British Columbia.
 George Henry Barnard b. 1868 first elected in 1908 as Conservative member for Victoria City, British Columbia.
 Rex Barnes b. 1959   first elected in 2002 as Progressive Conservative member for Gander—Grand Falls, Newfoundland and Labrador.
 Sue Barnes b. 1952   first elected in 1993 as Liberal member for London West, Ontario.
 Thomas Speakman Barnett b. 1909   first elected in 1953 as Co-operative Commonwealth Federation member for Comox—Alberni, British Columbia.
 John Barr b. 1843 first elected in 1904 as Conservative member for Dufferin, Ontario.
 Dave Barrett b. 1930   first elected in 1988 as New Democratic Party member for Esquimalt—Juan de Fuca, British Columbia.
 H. Gordon Barrett b. 1915   first elected in 1968 as Liberal member for Lincoln, Ontario.
 Michael Barrett b. 1984 first elected in 2018 as Conservative member for Leeds—Grenville—Thousand Islands and Rideau Lakes, Ontario. 
 Theobald Butler Barrett b. 1894   first elected in 1945 as Progressive Conservative member for Norfolk, Ontario.
 Gilbert Barrette b. 1941   first elected in 2003 as Liberal member for Témiscamingue, Quebec.
 Joseph Arthur Barrette b. 1875   first elected in 1911 as Conservative member for Berthier, Quebec.
 Merrill Edwin Barrington b. 1920   first elected in 1958 as Progressive Conservative member for Châteauguay—Huntingdon—Laprairie, Quebec.
 John Augustus Barron b. 1850 first elected in 1887 as Liberal member for Victoria North, Ontario.
 Lisa Marie Barron first elected in 2021 as New Democratic Party member for Nanaimo—Ladysmith, British Columbia. 
 John Patrick Barry b. 1893   first elected in 1935 as Liberal member for Northumberland, New Brunswick.
 Xavier Barsalou-Duval b. 1988 first elected in 2015 as Bloc Québécois member for Pierre-Boucher—Les Patriotes—Verchères, Quebec.
 Georges Isidore Barthe b. 1834 first elected in 1870 as Independent Conservative member for Richelieu, Quebec.
 Ron Basford b. 1932   first elected in 1963 as Liberal member for Vancouver—Burrard, British Columbia.
 James William Baskin b. 1920   first elected in 1957 as Progressive Conservative member for Renfrew South, Ontario.
 Joyce Bateman b. 1957 first elected in 2011 as Conservative member for Winnipeg South Centre, Manitoba. 
 Arthur James Bater b. 1889   first elected in 1949 as Liberal member for The Battlefords, Saskatchewan.
 Herman Maxwell Batten b. 1909   first elected in 1953 as Liberal member for Humber—St. George's, Newfoundland and Labrador.
 Dave Batters b. 1969   first elected in 2004 as Conservative member for Palliser, Saskatchewan.
 Jaime Battiste b. 1979 first elected in 2019 as Liberal member for Sydney—Victoria, Nova Scotia.
 Peter Colwell Bawden b. 1929   first elected in 1972 as Progressive Conservative member for Calgary South, Alberta.
 John Babington Macaulay Baxter b. 1868 first elected in 1921 as Conservative member for St. John—Albert, New Brunswick.
 Frank Baylis b. 1962 first elected in 2015 as Liberal member for Pierrefonds—Dollard, Quebec. 
 Charles Bazinet b. 1845 first elected in 1896 as Liberal member for Joliette, Quebec.

Be

 Duncan Beattie b. 1929   first elected in 1972 as Progressive Conservative member for Hamilton Mountain, Ontario.
 Robert Ethelbert Beattie first elected in 1921 as Liberal member for Kootenay East, British Columbia.
 Thomas Beattie b. 1844 first elected in 1896 as Conservative member for London, Ontario.
 Perrin Beatty b. 1950   first elected in 1972 as Progressive Conservative member for Wellington—Grey—Dufferin—Waterloo, Ontario.
 James Beaty b. 1798 first elected in 1867 as Conservative member for Toronto East, Ontario.
 James Beaty b. 1831 first elected in 1880 as Conservative member for West Toronto, Ontario.
 Arthur-Lucien Beaubien b. 1879   first elected in 1921 as Liberal member for Provencher, Manitoba.
 Joseph-Octave Beaubien b. 1825 first elected in 1867 as Conservative member for Montmagny, Quebec.
 Louis Beaubien b. 1837 first elected in 1872 as Conservative member for Hochelaga, Quebec.
 David Wilson Beaubier b. 1864 first elected in 1930 as Conservative member for Brandon, Manitoba.
 Suzanne Beauchamp-Niquet b. 1932   first elected in 1980 as Liberal member for Roberval, Quebec.
 Pierre-Clovis Beauchesne b. 1841 first elected in 1879 as Conservative member for Bonaventure, Quebec.
 Josée Beaudin b. 1961 first elected in 2008 as Bloc Québécois member for Saint-Lambert, Quebec. 
 Léonel Beaudoin b. 1924   first elected in 1968 as Ralliement Créditiste member for Richmond, Quebec.
 Louis-René Beaudoin b. 1912   first elected in 1945 as Liberal member for Vaudreuil—Soulanges, Quebec.
 Roland Beaudry b. 1906   first elected in 1945 as Liberal member for St. James, Quebec.
 Jean Robert Beaulé b. 1927   first elected in 1962 as Social Credit member for Quebec East, Quebec.
 Jean-Paul Beaulieu b. 1902   first elected in 1965 as Progressive Conservative member for Saint-Jean—Iberville—Napierville, Quebec.
 Mario Beaulieu b. 1959 first elected in 1959 as Bloc Québécois member for La Pointe-de-l'Île, Quebec.
 Colleen Beaumier b. 1944   first elected in 1993 as Liberal member for Brampton, Ontario.
 Aimé Majorique Beauparlant b. 1864 first elected in 1904 as Liberal member for St. Hyacinthe, Quebec.
 Cléophas Beausoleil b. 1845 first elected in 1887 as Liberal member for Berthier, Quebec.
 Albert Béchard b. 1922   first elected in 1962 as Liberal member for Bonaventure, Quebec.
 François Béchard b. 1830 first elected in 1867 as Liberal member for Iberville, Quebec.
 William George Beech b. 1898   first elected in 1957 as Progressive Conservative member for York South, Ontario.
 Terry Beech b. 1981 first elected in 2015 as Liberal member for Burnaby North—Seymour, British Columbia.
 Bruce Silas Beer b. 1910   first elected in 1962 as Liberal member for Peel, Ontario.
 Monique Bégin b. 1936   first elected in 1972 as Liberal member for Saint-Michel, Quebec.
 René Bégin b. 1912   first elected in 1957 as Liberal member for Quebec West, Quebec.
 Robert Beith b. 1843 first elected in 1891 as Liberal member for Durham West, Ontario.
 Réginald Bélair b. 1949   first elected in 1988 as Liberal member for Cochrane—Superior, Ontario.
 Henri Sévérin Béland b. 1869 first elected in 1902 as Liberal member for Beauce, Quebec.
 Louis-Philippe-Antoine Bélanger b. 1907   first elected in 1962 as Social Credit member for Charlevoix, Quebec.
 Mauril Bélanger b. 1955   first elected in 1995 as Liberal member for Ottawa—Vanier, Ontario.
 Napoléon Belcourt b. 1860 first elected in 1896 as Liberal member for City of Ottawa, Ontario.
 Charles Bélec b. 1872 first elected in 1930 as Conservative member for Pontiac, Quebec.
 Richard Bélisle b. 1946   first elected in 1993 as Bloc Québécois member for La Prairie, Quebec.
 Adam Carr Bell b. 1847 first elected in 1896 as Conservative member for Pictou, Nova Scotia.
 Catherine J. Bell, first elected in 2006 as New Democratic Party member for Vancouver Island North, British Columbia
 Charles William Bell b. 1876   first elected in 1925 as Conservative member for Hamilton West, Ontario.
 Don Bell b. 1942   first elected in 2004 as Liberal member for North Vancouver, British Columbia.
 John Howatt Bell b. 1845 first elected in 1898 as Liberal member for East Prince, Prince Edward Island.
 John William Bell b. 1838 first elected in 1882 as Conservative member for Addington, Ontario.
 Leslie Gordon Bell b. 1889   first elected in 1925 as Conservative member for St. Antoine, Quebec.
 Dick Bell b. 1913   first elected in 1957 as Progressive Conservative member for Carleton, Ontario.
 Thomas Bell b. 1863 first elected in 1925 as Conservative member for St. John—Albert, New Brunswick.
 Thomas Miller Bell b. 1923   first elected in 1953 as Progressive Conservative member for St. John—Albert, New Brunswick.
 André Bellavance b. 1964   first elected in 2004 as Bloc Québécois member for Richmond—Arthabaska, Quebec.
 Isidore-Noël Belleau b. 1848 first elected in 1883 as Conservative member for Lévis, Quebec.
 Michel Bellehumeur b. 1963   first elected in 1993 as Bloc Québécois member for Berthier—Montcalm, Quebec.
 Adélard Bellemare b. 1871 first elected in 1911 as Independent Conservative member for Maskinongé, Quebec.
 Eugène Bellemare b. 1932   first elected in 1988 as Liberal member for Carleton—Gloucester, Ontario.
 Joseph Hyacinthe Bellerose b. 1820 first elected in 1867 as Conservative member for Laval, Quebec.
 Louis de Gonzague Belley b. 1863 first elected in 1892 as Conservative member for Chicoutimi—Saguenay, Quebec.
 Ross Belsher b. 1933   first elected in 1984 as Progressive Conservative member for Fraser Valley East, British Columbia.
 Alfred Belzile b. 1907   first elected in 1958 as Progressive Conservative member for Matapédia—Matane, Quebec.
 Gleason Belzile b. 1898   first elected in 1945 as Liberal member for Rimouski, Quebec.
 Alfred Henry Bence b. 1908   first elected in 1940 as Progressive Conservative member for Saskatoon City, Saskatchewan.
 Rachel Bendayan b. 1980 first elected in 2019 as Liberal member for Outremont, Quebec.
 William Moore Benidickson b. 1911   first elected in 1945 as Liberal member for Kenora—Rainy River, Ontario.
 Les Benjamin b. 1925   first elected in 1968 as New Democratic Party member for Regina—Lake Centre, Saskatchewan.
 Carolyn Bennett b. 1950   first elected in 1997 as Liberal member for St. Paul's, Ontario.
 Colin Emerson Bennett b. 1908   first elected in 1949 as Liberal member for Grey North, Ontario.
 Richard Bedford Bennett b. 1870 first elected in 1911 as Conservative member for Calgary, Alberta.
 Sybil Bennett b. 1904   first elected in 1953 as Progressive Conservative member for Halton, Ontario.
 William Humphrey Bennett b. 1859 first elected in 1892 as Conservative member for Simcoe East, Ontario.
 Aldéric-Joseph Benoit b. 1877   first elected in 1922 as Liberal member for St. Johns—Iberville, Quebec.
 Leon Benoit b. 1950   first elected in 1993 as Reform member for Vegreville, Alberta.
 Pierre Basile Benoit b. 1837 first elected in 1867 as Conservative member for Chambly, Quebec.
 Tyrone Benskin b. 1958 first elected in 2011 as New Democratic Party member for Jeanne-Le Ber, Quebec. 
 Edgar John Benson b. 1923   first elected in 1962 as Liberal member for Kingston, Ontario.
 James Rea Benson b. 1807 first elected in 1867 as Liberal-Conservative member for Lincoln, Ontario.
 Sheri Benson first elected in 2015 as New Democratic Party member for Saskatoon West, Saskatchewan.
 William Thomas Benson b. 1858 first elected in 1882 as Conservative member for Grenville South, Ontario.
 Thomas John Bentley b. 1891   first elected in 1945 as Co-operative Commonwealth Federation member for Swift Current, Saskatchewan.
 Bob Benzen b. 1959 first elected in 2017 as Conservative member for Calgary Heritage, Alberta. 
 Peter Bercovitch b. 1879   first elected in 1938 as Liberal member for Cartier, Quebec.
 Candice Bergen b. 1964 first elected in 2008 as Conservative member for Portage—Lisgar, Manitoba.
 David Berger b. 1950   first elected in 1979 as Liberal member for Laurier, Quebec.
 Jean-Charles Richard Berger b. 1924   first elected in 1963 as Liberal member for Montmagny—l'Islet, Quebec.
 Thomas Berger b. 1933   first elected in 1962 as New Democratic Party member for Vancouver—Burrard, British Columbia.
 Joseph Gédéon Horace Bergeron b. 1854 first elected in 1879 as Conservative member for Beauharnois, Quebec.
 Stéphane Bergeron b. 1965   first elected in 1993 as Bloc Québécois member for Verchères, Quebec.
 Darby Bergin b. 1826 first elected in 1872 as Liberal-Conservative member for Cornwall, Ontario.
 André Bernier b. 1930   first elected in 1962 as Social Credit member for Richmond—Wolfe, Quebec.
 Gilles Bernier b. 1934   first elected in 1984 as Progressive Conservative member for Beauce, Quebec.
 Gilles Bernier b. 1955   first elected in 1997 as Progressive Conservative member for Tobique—Mactaquac, New Brunswick.
 Henri Bernier b. 1821 first elected in 1874 as Liberal member for Lotbinière, Quebec.
 Maurice Bernier b. 1947   first elected in 1993 as Bloc Québécois member for Mégantic—Compton—Stanstead, Quebec.
 Maxime Bernier first elected in 2006 as Conservative member for Beauce, Quebec
 Michel Esdras Bernier b. 1841 first elected in 1882 as Liberal member for St. Hyacinthe, Quebec.
 Yvan Bernier b. 1960 first elected in 1993 as Bloc Québécois member for Gaspé, Quebec.
 Luc Berthold first elected in 2015 as Conservative member for Mégantic—L'Érable, Quebec.
 George Hope Bertram b. 1847 first elected in 1897 as Liberal member for Toronto Centre, Ontario.
 John Bertram b. 1837 first elected in 1872 as Liberal member for Peterborough West, Ontario.
 Charles Bertrand b. 1824 first elected in 1867 as Conservative member for Témiscouata, Quebec.
 Elie-Oscar Bertrand b. 1894   first elected in 1929 as Liberal member for Prescott, Ontario.
 Ernest Bertrand b. 1888   first elected in 1935 as Liberal member for Laurier, Quebec.
 Gabrielle Bertrand b. 1923   first elected in 1984 as Progressive Conservative member for Brome—Missisquoi, Quebec.
 Lionel Bertrand b. 1906   first elected in 1940 as Independent Liberal member for Terrebonne, Quebec.
 Robert Bertrand b. 1953   first elected in 1993 as Liberal member for Pontiac—Gatineau—Labelle, Quebec.
 Sylvie Bérubé first elected in 2019 as Bloc Québécois member for Abitibi—Baie-James—Nunavik—Eeyou, Quebec.
 Lyne Bessette b. 1975 first elected in 2019 as Liberal member for Brome—Missisquoi, Quebec.
 Charles Alexander Best b. 1931   first elected in 1957 as Progressive Conservative member for Halton, Ontario.
 John Best b. 1861 first elected in 1909 as Conservative member for Dufferin, Ontario.
 Judy Bethel b. 1943   first elected in 1993 as Liberal member for Edmonton East, Alberta.
 John Lemuel Bethune b. 1850 first elected in 1896 as Conservative member for Victoria, Nova Scotia.
 Arthur Bettez b. 1871 first elected in 1925 as Liberal member for Three Rivers—St. Maurice, Quebec.
 Frederick Cronyn Betts b. 1896   first elected in 1935 as Conservative member for London, Ontario.
 Maurizio Bevilacqua b. 1960   first elected in 1988 as Liberal member for York North, Ontario.
 Dennis Bevington first elected in 2006 as New Democratic Party member for Western Arctic, Northwest Territories
 Hilliard Beyerstein b. 1907   first elected in 1949 as Social Credit member for Camrose, Alberta.
 William Addison Beynon b. 1877   first elected in 1930 as Conservative member for Moose Jaw, Saskatchewan.
 James Bezan b. 1965   first elected in 2004 as Conservative member for Selkirk—Interlake, Manitoba.
 Jag Bhaduria b. 1940   first elected in 1993 as Liberal member for Markham—Whitchurch—Stouffville, Ontario.

Bi
 Marie-Claude Bibeau b. 1970 first elected in 2015 as Liberal member for Compton—Stanstead member for Quebec.
 Robert Bickerdike b. 1843 first elected in 1900 as Liberal member for St. Lawrence, Quebec.
 Jack Bigg b. 1912   first elected in 1958 as Progressive Conservative member for Athabaska, Alberta.
 James Lyons Biggar b. 1824 first elected in 1874 as Independent Liberal member for Northumberland East, Ontario.
 Bernard Bigras b. 1969   first elected in 1997 as Bloc Québécois member for Rosemont, Quebec.
 Silas Tertius Rand Bill b. 1842 first elected in 1878 as Liberal-Conservative member for Queens, Nova Scotia.
 Louis Adolphe Billy b. 1834 first elected in 1882 as Conservative member for Rimouski, Quebec.
 Gérard Binet b. 1955   first elected in 2000 as Liberal member for Frontenac—Mégantic, Quebec.
 Joseph Binette b. 1861 first elected in 1921 as Progressive member for Prescott, Ontario.
 Kenneth C. Binks b. 1925   first elected in 1979 as Progressive Conservative member for Ottawa West, Ontario.
 Pat Binns b. 1948   first elected in 1984 as Progressive Conservative member for Cardigan, Prince Edward Island.
 Bud Bird b. 1932   first elected in 1988 as Progressive Conservative member for Fredericton, New Brunswick.
 Thomas William Bird b. 1883   first elected in 1921 as Progressive member for Nelson, Manitoba.
 Thomas Birkett b. 1844 first elected in 1900 as Conservative member for City of Ottawa, Ontario.
 Edgar Douglas Richmond Bissett b. 1890   first elected in 1926 as Liberal Progressive member for Springfield, Manitoba.
 André Bissonnette b. 1945   first elected in 1984 as Progressive Conservative member for Saint-Jean, Quebec.
 J.-Eugène Bissonnette b. 1892   first elected in 1958 as Progressive Conservative member for Quebec West, Quebec.
 Chris Bittle b. 1979 first elected in 2015 as Liberal member for St. Catharines, Ontario.
 David Bjornson b. 1947   first elected in 1988 as Progressive Conservative member for Selkirk—Red River, Manitoba.

Bl

 Dawn Black b. 1943   first elected in 1988 as New Democratic Party member for New Westminster—Burnaby, British Columbia.
 Donald Elmer Black b. 1892   first elected in 1935 as Liberal member for Châteauguay—Huntingdon, Quebec.
 George Black b. 1873 first elected in 1921 as Conservative member for Yukon, Yukon.
 Judson Burpee Black b. 1842 first elected in 1904 as Liberal member for Hants, Nova Scotia.
 Martha Black b. 1866 first elected in 1935 as Independent Conservative member for Yukon, Yukon.
 Percy Chapman Black b. 1878   first elected in 1940 as National Government member for Cumberland, Nova Scotia.
 William Black b. 1869 first elected in 1921 as Progressive member for Huron South, Ontario.
 William Anderson Black b. 1847 first elected in 1923 as Conservative member for Halifax, Nova Scotia.
 Edward Blackadder b. 1874 first elected in 1921 as Liberal member for Halifax, Nova Scotia.
 Derek Blackburn b. 1934   first elected in 1971 as New Democratic Party member for Brant, Ontario.
 Jean-Pierre Blackburn b. 1948   first elected in 1984 as Progressive Conservative member for Jonquière, Quebec.
 Robert Blackburn b. 1828 first elected in 1874 as Liberal member for Russell, Ontario.
 John Horne Blackmore b. 1890   first elected in 1935 as Social Credit member for Lethbridge, Alberta.
 Bill Blaikie b. 1951   first elected in 1979 as New Democratic Party member for Winnipeg—Birds Hill, Manitoba.
 Daniel Blaikie b. 1984 first elected in 2015 as New Democratic Party member for Elmwood—Transcona, Manitoba.
 David Blain b. 1832 first elected in 1872 as Liberal member for York West, Ontario.
 Richard Blain b. 1857 first elected in 1900 as Conservative member for Peel, Ontario.
 Andrew George Blair b. 1844 first elected in 1896 as Liberal member for Sunbury—Queen's, New Brunswick.
 Bill Blair b. 1954 first elected in 2015 as Liberal member for Scarborough Southwest, Ontario. 
 Gordon Blair b. 1919   first elected in 1968 as Liberal member for Grenville—Carleton, Ontario.
 John Knox Blair b. 1875   first elected in 1930 as Liberal member for Wellington North, Ontario.
 William Gourlay Blair b. 1890   first elected in 1945 as Progressive Conservative member for Lanark, Ontario.
 William John Blair b. 1875   first elected in 1917 as Unionist member for Battle River, Alberta.
 François Blais b. 1875   first elected in 1935 as Independent Liberal member for Chapleau, Quebec.
 Jean-Jacques Blais b. 1940   first elected in 1972 as Liberal member for Nipissing, Ontario.
 Pierre Blais b. 1948   first elected in 1984 as Progressive Conservative member for Bellechasse, Quebec.
 Raynald Blais b. 1954   first elected in 2004 as Bloc Québécois member for Gaspésie—Îles-de-la-Madeleine, Quebec.
 Suzanne Blais-Grenier first elected in 1984 as Progressive Conservative member for Rosemont, Quebec.
 Edward Blake b. 1833 first elected in 1867 as Liberal member for Durham West, Ontario.
 Matthew Robert Blake b. 1876   first elected in 1917 as Unionist member for Winnipeg North, Manitoba.
 Roderick Blaker b. 1936   first elected in 1972 as Liberal member for Lachine, Quebec.
 Stanislas Blanchard b. 1871 first elected in 1926 as Liberal member for Restigouche—Madawaska, New Brunswick.
 Théotime Blanchard b. 1846 first elected in 1894 as Conservative member for Gloucester, New Brunswick.
 Jean Baptiste Blanchet b. 1842 first elected in 1904 as Liberal member for St. Hyacinthe, Quebec.
 Joseph-Goderic Blanchet b. 1829 first elected in 1867 as Liberal-Conservative member for Lévis, Quebec.
 Yves-François Blanchet b. 1965 first elected in 2019 as Bloc Québécois member for Beloeil—Chambly, Quebec.
 Denis Blanchette b. 1956 first elected in 2011 as New Democratic Party member for Louis-Hébert, Quebec.
 Joseph-Adéodat Blanchette b. 1893   first elected in 1935 as Liberal member for Compton, Quebec.
 Maxime Blanchette-Joncas b. 1989 first elected in 2019 as Bloc Québécois member for Rimouski-Neigette—Témiscouata—Les Basques, Quebec.
 Lysane Blanchette-Lamothe b. 1984 first elected in 2011 as New Democratic Party member for Pierrefonds—Dollard, Quebec.
 Leonard Thomas Bland b. 1851 first elected in 1904 as Liberal-Conservative member for Bruce North, Ontario.
 Rachel Blaney b. 1974 first elected in 2015 as New Democratic Party member for North Island—Powell River, British Columbia.  
 Steven Blaney b. 1965 first elected in 2006 as Conservative member for Lévis—Bellechasse, Quebec
 Kenneth Alexander Blatchford b. 1882   first elected in 1926 as Liberal member for Edmonton East, Alberta.
 Don Blenkarn b. 1930   first elected in 1972 as Progressive Conservative member for Peel South, Ontario.
 Kelly Block b. 1961 first elected in 2008 as Conservative member for Saskatoon—Rosetown—Biggar, Saskatchewan.
 Kody Blois b. 1991 first elected in 2019 as Liberal member for Kings—Hants, Nova Scotia.
 Charles Bruno Blondeau b. 1835 first elected in 1882 as Conservative member for Kamouraska, Quebec.
 Pierre Édouard Blondin b. 1874 first elected in 1908 as Conservative member for Champlain, Quebec.
 Ethel Blondin-Andrew b. 1951   first elected in 1988 as Liberal member for Western Arctic, Northwest Territories.
 Garnet McCallum Bloomfield b. 1929 first elected in 1980 as Liberal member for London—Middlesex, Ontario.
 Anne Blouin b. 1946 first elected in 1984 as Progressive Conservative member for Montmorency—Orléans, Quebec.
 Gustave Blouin b. 1912 first elected in 1963 as Liberal member for Saguenay, Quebec.
 Donald Buchanan Blue b. 1901 first elected in 1949 as Liberal member for Bruce, Ontario.

Bo

 William George Bock b. 1884 first elected in 1927 as Liberal member for Maple Creek, Saskatchewan.
 Robert Bockstael b. 1923 first elected in 1979 as Liberal member for St. Boniface, Manitoba.
 Morris Bodnar b. 1948 first elected in 1993 as Liberal member for Saskatoon—Dundurn, Saskatchewan.
 Ebenezer Vining Bodwell b. 1827 first elected in 1867 as Liberal member for Oxford South, Ontario.
 Alain Boire b. 1971 first elected in 2004 as Bloc Québécois member for Beauharnois—Salaberry, Quebec.
 Randy Boissonnault b. 1970 first elected in 2015 as Liberal member for Edmonton Centre, Alberta.
 Fabien Boisvert b. 1839 first elected in 1888 as Independent Conservative member for Nicolet, Quebec.
 Jean-Marie Boisvert first elected in 1972 as Social Credit member for Drummond, Quebec.
 Maurice Boisvert b. 1897 first elected in 1949 as Liberal member for Nicolet—Yamaska, Quebec.
 Françoise Boivin b. 1960 first elected in 2004 as Liberal member for Gatineau, Quebec.
 Georges Henri Boivin b. 1882 first elected in 1911 as Liberal member for Shefford, Quebec.
 Marcel Boivin b. 1912 first elected in 1945 as Liberal member for Shefford, Quebec.
 Pierre-Ernest Boivin b. 1872 first elected in 1926 as Liberal member for Shefford, Quebec.
 Joseph Bolduc b. 1847 first elected in 1876 as Conservative member for Beauce, Quebec.
 David Wesley Bole b. 1856 first elected in 1904 as Liberal member for Winnipeg, Manitoba.
 Ferris Bolton b. 1853 first elected in 1917 as Unionist member for Lisgar, Manitoba.
 John Bolton b. 1824 first elected in 1867 as Liberal member for Charlotte, New Brunswick.
 Raymond Bonin b. 1942 first elected in 1993 as Liberal member for Nickel Belt, Ontario.
 Saul Bonnell b. 1871 first elected in 1917 as Unionist member for Kootenay East, British Columbia.
 Joseph-Arsène Bonnier b. 1879 first elected in 1938 as Liberal member for St. Henry, Quebec.
 France Bonsant b. 1952 first elected in 2004 as Bloc Québécois member for Compton—Stanstead, Quebec.
 Paul Bonwick b. 1964 first elected in 1997 as Liberal member for Simcoe—Grey, Ontario.
 Charles Stephen Booth b. 1897 first elected in 1940 as Liberal member for Winnipeg North, Manitoba.
 Frederick William Borden b. 1847 first elected in 1874 as Liberal member for Kings, Nova Scotia.
 Robert Borden b. 1854 first elected in 1896 as Conservative member for Halifax, Nova Scotia.
 Charmaine Borg b. 1990 first elected in 2011 as New Democratic Party member for Terrebonne—Blainville, Quebec.
 Rick Borotsik b. 1950 first elected in 1997 as Progressive Conservative member for Brandon—Souris, Manitoba.
 Robert James Borrie b. 1926 first elected in 1968 as Liberal member for Prince George—Peace River, British Columbia.
 Edward Borron b. 1820 first elected in 1874 as Liberal member for Algoma, Ontario.
 Ken Boshcoff b. 1949 first elected in 2004 as Liberal member for Thunder Bay—Rainy River, Ontario.
 John William Bosley b. 1947 first elected in 1979 as Progressive Conservative member for Don Valley West, Ontario.
 Joseph Guillaume Bossé b. 1843 first elected in 1882 as Conservative member for Quebec-Centre, Quebec.
 Mike Bossio first elected in 2015 as Liberal member for Hastings—Lennox and Addington, Ontario.
 Maurice Bossy b. 1929 first elected in 1980 as Liberal member for Kent, Ontario.
 Hewitt Bostock b. 1864 first elected in 1896 as Liberal member for Yale—Cariboo, British Columbia.
 Robert Boston b. 1836 first elected in 1893 as Liberal member for Middlesex South, Ontario.
 Charles Edward Bothwell b. 1882 first elected in 1925 as Liberal member for Swift Current, Saskatchewan.
 Benoît Bouchard b. 1940 first elected in 1984 as Progressive Conservative member for Roberval, Quebec.
 Joseph Georges Bouchard b. 1888 first elected in 1922 as Liberal member for Kamouraska, Quebec.
 Lucien Bouchard b. 1938 first elected in 1988 as Progressive Conservative member for Lac-Saint-Jean, Quebec.
 Robert Bouchard b. 1943 first elected in 2004 as Bloc Québécois member for Chicoutimi—Le Fjord, Quebec.
 Aimé Boucher b. 1877 first elected in 1921 as Liberal member for Yamaska, Quebec.
 George Russell Boucher b. 1899 first elected in 1940 as Progressive Conservative member for Carleton, Ontario.
 Jean Boucher b. 1926 first elected in 1953 as Liberal member for Châteauguay—Huntingdon—Laprairie, Quebec.
 Joseph Gaspard Boucher b. 1897 first elected in 1953 as Liberal member for Restigouche—Madawaska, New Brunswick.
 Sylvie Boucher b. 1962 first elected in 2006 as Conservative member for Beauport—Limoilou, Quebec
 William Albert Boucher b. 1889 first elected in 1948 as Liberal member for Rosthern, Saskatchewan.
 Louis Charles Boucher De Niverville b. 1825 first elected in 1867 as Conservative member for Three Rivers, Quebec.
 Don Boudria b. 1949 first elected in 1984 as Liberal member for Glengarry—Prescott—Russell, Ontario.
 Michel Boudrias b. 1977 first elected in 2015 as Bloc Québécois member for Terrebonne, Quebec. 
 Ray Boughen b. 1937 first elected in 2008 as Conservative member for Palliser, Saskatchewan. 
 Joseph Oscar Lefebre Boulanger b. 1888 first elected in 1926 as Liberal member for Bellechasse, Quebec.
 Prosper Boulanger b. 1918 first elected in 1962 as Liberal member for Mercier, Quebec.
 Samuel Boulanger b. 1909 first elected in 1957 as Independent Liberal member for Drummond—Arthabaska, Quebec.
 Herménégilde Boulay b. 1861 first elected in 1911 as Conservative member for Rimouski, Quebec.
 Alexandre Boulerice b. 1973 first elected in 2011 as New Democratic Party member for Rosemont—La Petite-Patrie, Quebec. 
 Marc Boulianne b. 1941 first elected in 2004 as Bloc Québécois member for Mégantic—L'Érable, Quebec.
 Alfred Boultbee b. 1829 first elected in 1878 as Conservative member for York East, Ontario.
 François Bourassa b. 1813 first elected in 1867 as Liberal member for St. John's, Quebec.
 Joseph Boutin Bourassa b. 1853 first elected in 1911 as Liberal member for Lévis, Quebec.
 Henri Bourassa b. 1868 first elected in 1896 as Liberal member for Labelle, Quebec.
 Désiré Olivier Bourbeau b. 1834 first elected in 1877 as Conservative member for Drummond—Arthabaska, Quebec.
 Augustin Bourbonnais b. 1850 first elected in 1896 as Liberal member for Soulanges, Quebec.
 Marcel Bourbonnais b. 1918 first elected in 1958 as Progressive Conservative member for Vaudreuil—Soulanges, Quebec.
 Rodrigue Bourdages b. 1923 first elected in 1958 as Progressive Conservative member for Laval, Quebec.
 Lise Bourgault b. 1950 first elected in 1984 as Progressive Conservative member for Argenteuil—Papineau, Quebec.
 Alfred Edmond Bourgeois b. 1872 first elected in 1926 as Liberal member for Kent, New Brunswick.
 Charles Bourgeois b. 1879 first elected in 1931 as Conservative member for Three Rivers—St. Maurice, Quebec.
 Diane Bourgeois b. 1949 first elected in 2000 as Bloc Québécois member for Terrebonne—Blainville, Quebec.
 Maurice Bourget b. 1907 first elected in 1940 as Liberal member for Lévis, Quebec.
 Romuald Bourque b. 1889 first elected in 1952 as Liberal member for Outremont—St-Jean, Quebec.
 Arthur Moren Boutillier b. 1869 first elected in 1925 as Progressive member for Vegreville, Alberta.
 Pierre-André Boutin b. 1934 first elected in 1962 as Social Credit member for Dorchester, Quebec.
 Marjolaine Boutin-Sweet b. 1955 first elected in 2011 as New Democratic Party member for Hochelaga, Quebec.
 Mackenzie Bowell b. 1823 first elected in 1867 as Conservative member for Hastings North, Ontario.
 Fred Wellington Bowen b. 1877 first elected in 1921 as Conservative member for Durham, Ontario.
 John Oates Bower b. 1901 first elected in 1965 as Progressive Conservative member for Shelburne—Yarmouth—Clare, Nova Scotia.
 Edward LeRoy Bowerman b. 1892 first elected in 1945 as Co-operative Commonwealth Federation member for Prince Albert, Saskatchewan.
 Edward Charles Bowers b. 1845 first elected in 1891 as Liberal member for Digby, Nova Scotia.
 Beniah Bowman b. 1886 first elected in 1926 as United Farmers of Ontario member for Algoma East, Ontario.
 Isaac Erb Bowman b. 1832 first elected in 1867 as Liberal member for Waterloo North, Ontario.
 James Bowman b. 1861 first elected in 1911 as Conservative member for Huron East, Ontario.
 James Langstaff Bowman b. 1879 first elected in 1930 as Conservative member for Dauphin, Manitoba.
 John Young Bown b. 1821 first elected in 1867 as Liberal-Conservative member for Brant North, Ontario.
 Arthur Cyril Boyce b. 1867 first elected in 1904 as Conservative member for Algoma West, Ontario.
 George Boyce b. 1848 first elected in 1917 as Unionist member for Carleton, Ontario.
 Nathaniel Boyd b. 1853 first elected in 1892 as Conservative member for Marquette, Manitoba.
 Gustave Benjamin Boyer b. 1871 first elected in 1904 as Liberal member for Vaudreuil, Quebec.
 Louis Alphonse Boyer b. 1839 first elected in 1872 as Liberal member for Maskinongé, Quebec.
 Patrick Boyer b. 1945 first elected in 1984 as Progressive Conservative member for Etobicoke—Lakeshore, Ontario.
 Frank Boyes b. 1874 first elected in 1930 as Conservative member for Middlesex East, Ontario.
 Arthur Boyle b. 1842 first elected in 1887 as Conservative member for Monck, Ontario.
 William Alves Boys b. 1868 first elected in 1912 as Conservative member for Simcoe South, Ontario.

Br

 Gerald Hugh Brabazon b. 1854 first elected in 1904 as Conservative member for Pontiac, Quebec.
 John Bracken b. 1883 first elected in 1945 as Progressive Conservative member for Neepawa, Manitoba.
 George Henry Bradbury b. 1859 first elected in 1908 as Conservative member for Selkirk, Manitoba.
 Joseph-Arthur Bradette b. 1886 first elected in 1926 as Liberal member for Timiskaming North, Ontario.
 Valerie Bradford first elected in 2021 as Liberal member for Kitchener South—Hespeler, Ontario. 
 Frederick Gordon Bradley b. 1888 first elected in 1949 as Liberal member for Bonavista—Twillingate, Newfoundland and Labrador.
 Harry Oliver Bradley b. 1929 first elected in 1962 as Progressive Conservative member for Northumberland, Ontario.
 Bud Bradley b. 1938 first elected in 1979 as Progressive Conservative member for Haldimand—Norfolk, Ontario.
 Albert James Bradshaw b. 1882 first elected in 1945 as Progressive Conservative member for Perth, Ontario.
 Claudette Bradshaw b. 1949 first elected in 1997 as Liberal member for Moncton, New Brunswick.
 James Charles Brady b. 1876 first elected in 1926 as Conservative member for Skeena, British Columbia.
 Richard Bragdon first elected in 2019 as Conservative member for Tobique—Mactaquac, New Brunswick.  
 Tarik Brahmi b. 1968 first elected in 2011 as New Democratic Party member for Saint-Jean, Quebec. 
 Peter Braid b. 1964 first elected in 2008 as Conservative member for Kitchener—Waterloo, Ontario. 
 Lewis Brand b. 1925 first elected in 1965 as Progressive Conservative member for Saskatoon, Saskatchewan.
 Augustin Brassard b. 1922 first elected in 1957 as Liberal member for Lapointe, Quebec.
 John Brassard b. 1964 first elected in 2015 as Conservative member for Barrie—Innisfil, Ontario. 
 Vincent Brassard b. 1919 first elected in 1958 as Progressive Conservative member for Chicoutimi, Quebec.
 Maurice Brasset b. 1884 first elected in 1930 as Liberal member for Gaspé, Quebec.
 Bob Bratina b. 1944 first elected in 2015 as Liberal member for Hamilton East—Stoney Creek, Ontairo.
 Herb Breau b. 1944 first elected in 1968 as Liberal member for Gloucester, New Brunswick.
 Michael Breaugh b. 1942 first elected in 1990 as New Democratic Party member for Oshawa, Ontario.
 Frederick de Sainte-Croix Brecken b. 1828 first elected in 1878 as Conservative member for Queen's County, Prince Edward Island.
 Louis Orville Breithaupt b. 1890 first elected in 1940 as Liberal member for Waterloo North, Ontario.
 Cliff Breitkreuz b. 1940 first elected in 1993 as Reform member for Yellowhead, Alberta.
 Garry Breitkreuz b. 1945 first elected in 1993 as Reform member for Yorkton—Melville, Saskatchewan.
 George Arthur Brethen b. 1877 first elected in 1921 as Progressive member for Peterborough East, Ontario.
 Maurice Breton b. 1909 first elected in 1950 as Liberal member for Joliette—l'Assomption—Montcalm, Quebec.
 Pierre Breton b. 1966 first elected in 2015 as Liberal member for Shefford, Quebec. 
 Andrew Brewin b. 1907 first elected in 1962 as New Democratic Party member for Greenwood, Ontario.
 John Brewin b. 1936 first elected in 1988 as New Democratic Party member for Victoria, British Columbia.
 Hedley Francis Gregory Bridges b. 1902 first elected in 1945 as Liberal member for York—Sunbury, New Brunswick.
 Margaret Bridgman b. 1940 first elected in 1993 as Reform member for Surrey North, British Columbia.
 James Brien b. 1848 first elected in 1887 as Liberal member for Essex South, Ontario.
 John Wesley Brien b. 1864 first elected in 1917 as Unionist member for Essex South, Ontario.
 Pierre Brien b. 1970 first elected in 1993 as Bloc Québécois member for Témiscamingue, Quebec.
 Élisabeth Brière b. 1968 first elected in 2019 as Liberal member for Sherbrooke, Quebec.
 Harry Brightwell b. 1932 first elected in 1984 as Progressive Conservative member for Perth, Ontario.
 Robert Hylton Brisco b. 1928 first elected in 1974 as Progressive Conservative member for Kootenay West, British Columbia.
 Scott Brison b. 1967 first elected in 1997 as Progressive Conservative member for Kings—Hants, Nova Scotia.
 Lomer Brisson b. 1916 first elected in 1949 as Liberal member for Saguenay, Quebec.
 Edmund James Bristol b. 1861 first elected in 1905 as Conservative member for Toronto Centre, Ontario.
 Byron Moffatt Britton b. 1833 first elected in 1896 as Liberal member for Kingston, Ontario.
 Ed Broadbent b. 1936 first elected in 1968 as New Democratic Party member for Oshawa—Whitby, Ontario.
 Larry Brock b. 1964 first elected in 2021 as Conservative member for Brantford—Brant, Ontario. 
 William Rees Brock b. 1836 first elected in 1900 as Conservative member for Toronto Centre, Ontario.
 Andrew Broder b. 1845 first elected in 1896 as Conservative member for Dundas, Ontario.
 Louis Philippe Brodeur b. 1862 first elected in 1891 as Liberal member for Rouville, Quebec.
 Alfred Johnson Brooks b. 1890 first elected in 1935 as Conservative member for Royal, New Brunswick.
 Edward Towle Brooks b. 1830 first elected in 1872 as Conservative member for Town of Sherbrooke, Quebec.
 Ernest James Broome b. 1908 first elected in 1957 as Progressive Conservative member for Vancouver South, British Columbia.
 Ruth Ellen Brosseau b. 1984 first elected in 2011 as New Democratic Party member for Berthier—Maskinongé, Quebec. 
 Joseph Ovide Brouillard b. 1859 first elected in 1911 as Liberal member for Drummond—Arthabaska, Quebec.
 William Henry Brouse b. 1824 first elected in 1872 as Liberal member for Grenville South, Ontario.
 Jean Docile Brousseau b. 1825 first elected in 1867 as Conservative member for Portneuf, Quebec.
 Pauline Browes b. 1938 first elected in 1984 as Progressive Conservative member for Scarborough Centre, Ontario.
 Adam Brown b. 1826 first elected in 1887 as Conservative member for Hamilton, Ontario.
 Albert A. Brown b. 1895 first elected in 1935 as Conservative member for Hamilton East, Ontario.
 Bonnie Brown b. 1941 first elected in 1993 as Liberal member for Oakville—Milton, Ontario.
 Donald Ferguson Brown b. 1903 first elected in 1945 as Liberal member for Essex West, Ontario.
 Gord Brown b. 1960 first elected in 2004 as Conservative member for Leeds—Grenville, Ontario.
 James Brown b. 1828 first elected in 1867 as Conservative member for Hastings West, Ontario.
 James Elisha Brown b. 1913 first elected in 1953 as Liberal member for Brantford, Ontario.
 James Pollock Brown b. 1841 first elected in 1891 as Liberal member for Châteauguay, Quebec.
 Jan Brown b. 1947 first elected in 1993 as Reform member for Calgary Southeast, Alberta.
 John Brown b. 1841 first elected in 1891 as Liberal member for Monck, Ontario.
 John Livingstone Brown b. 1867 first elected in 1921 as Progressive member for Lisgar, Manitoba.
 Lois Brown b. 1955 first elected in 2008 as Conservative member for Newmarket—Aurora, Ontario. 
 Patrick Brown first elected in 2006 as Conservative member for Barrie, Ontario
 Walter George Brown b. 1875 first elected in 1939 as United Reform Movement member for Saskatoon City, Saskatchewan. Died in office, 1940.
 John Ferguson Browne b. 1920 first elected in 1958 as Progressive Conservative member for Vancouver Kingsway, British Columbia.
 William Joseph Browne b. 1897 first elected in 1949 as Progressive Conservative member for St. John's West, Newfoundland and Labrador.
 Francis Carmichael Bruce b. 1837 first elected in 1900 as Conservative member for Hamilton, Ontario.
 Herbert Alexander Bruce b. 1868 first elected in 1940 as National Government member for Parkdale, Ontario.
 Gérard Bruchési b. 1931 first elected in 1958 as Progressive Conservative member for Beauharnois—Salaberry, Quebec.
 Rod Bruinooge, first elected in 2006 as Conservative member for Winnipeg South, Manitoba
 Arthur Aimé Bruneau b. 1864 first elected in 1892 as Liberal member for Richelieu, Quebec.
 Raymond Bruneau b. 1917 first elected in 1949 as Independent Liberal member for Prescott, Ontario.
 Hervé-Edgar Brunelle b. 1891 first elected in 1935 as Liberal member for Champlain, Quebec.
 Paule Brunelle b. 1953 first elected in 2004 as Bloc Québécois member for Trois-Rivières, Quebec.
 Alexis Brunelle-Duceppe b. 1979 first elected in 2019 as Bloc Québécois member for Lac-Saint-Jean, Quebec.
 Joseph Brunet b. 1834 first elected in 1902 as Liberal member for St. James, Quebec.
 Edwin William Brunsden b. 1896 first elected in 1958 as Progressive Conservative member for Medicine Hat, Alberta.
 Dianne Brushett b. 1942 first elected in 1993 as Liberal member for Cumberland—Colchester, Nova Scotia.
 William Bryce b. 1888 first elected in 1943 as Co-operative Commonwealth Federation member for Selkirk, Manitoba.
 John H. Bryden b. 1943 first elected in 1993 as Liberal member for Hamilton—Wentworth, Ontario.
 Hugh Alexander Bryson b. 1912 first elected in 1953 as Co-operative Commonwealth Federation member for Humboldt—Melfort, Saskatchewan.
 John Bryson b. 1849 first elected in 1882 as Conservative member for Pontiac, Quebec.

Bu

 Judd Buchanan b. 1929 first elected in 1968 as Liberal member for London West, Ontario.
 William Ashbury Buchanan b. 1876 first elected in 1911 as Liberal member for Medicine Hat, Alberta.
 William Murdoch Buchanan b. 1897 first elected in 1953 as Liberal member for Cape Breton North and Victoria, Nova Scotia.
 John Francis Buckley b. 1891 first elected in 1930 as Liberal member for Athabaska, Alberta.
 Jacob Dockstader Buell b. 1827 first elected in 1872 as Liberal member for Brockville, Ontario.
 Rémi Bujold b. 1944 first elected in 1979 as Liberal member for Bonaventure—Îles-de-la-Madeleine, Quebec.
 Sarmite Bulte b. 1953 first elected in 1997 as Liberal member for Parkdale—High Park, Ontario.
 Arthur Bunster b. 1827 first elected in 1874 as Liberal member for Vancouver, British Columbia.
 Christopher William Bunting b. 1837 first elected in 1878 as Liberal-Conservative member for Welland, Ontario.
 Samuel Barton Burdett b. 1843 first elected in 1887 as Liberal member for Hastings East, Ontario.
 Jacques Bureau b. 1860 first elected in 1900 as Liberal member for Three Rivers and St. Maurice, Quebec.
 John Wesley Burgess b. 1907 first elected in 1962 as Liberal member for Lambton—Kent, Ontario.
 Jack Burghardt b. 1929 first elected in 1981 as Liberal member for London West, Ontario.
 Harvey William Burk b. 1822 first elected in 1874 as Liberal member for Durham West, Ontario.
 Leonard Burnett b. 1845 first elected in 1896 as Liberal member for Ontario South, Ontario.
 John Burnham b. 1842 first elected in 1878 as Conservative member for Peterborough East, Ontario.
 John Hampden Burnham b. 1860 first elected in 1911 as Conservative member for Peterborough West, Ontario.
 Kennedy Francis Burns b. 1842 first elected in 1882 as Conservative member for Gloucester, New Brunswick.
 William Herbert Burns b. 1878 first elected in 1930 as Conservative member for Portage la Prairie, Manitoba.
 Charles Burpee b. 1817 first elected in 1867 as Liberal member for Sunbury, New Brunswick.
 Isaac Burpee b. 1825 first elected in 1872 as Liberal member for City and County of St. John, New Brunswick.
 Martin Burrell b. 1858 first elected in 1908 as Conservative member for Yale—Cariboo, British Columbia.
 Theodore Arthur Burrows b. 1857 first elected in 1904 as Liberal member for Dauphin, Manitoba.
 Andy Burton b. 1942 first elected in 2000 as Canadian Alliance member for Skeena, British Columbia.
 Francis Henry Burton b. 1817 first elected in 1867 as Conservative member for Durham East, Ontario.
 John Burton b. 1927 first elected in 1968 as New Democratic Party member for Regina East, Saskatchewan.
 Joseph William Burton b. 1892 first elected in 1943 as Co-operative Commonwealth Federation member for Humboldt, Saskatchewan.
 Ambrose Upton Gledstanes Bury b. 1869 first elected in 1925 as Conservative member for Edmonton East, Alberta.
 Pierre Bussières b. 1939 first elected in 1974 as Liberal member for Portneuf, Quebec.
 Harry Butcher b. 1873 first elected in 1930 as Liberal member for Last Mountain, Saskatchewan.
 Steve Butland b. 1941 first elected in 1988 as New Democratic Party member for Sault Ste. Marie, Ontario.
Brad Butt b. 1967 first elected in 2011 as Conservative Party member for Mississauga—Streetsville, Ontario. 
 Robert Hamilton Butts b. 1871 first elected in 1917 as Unionist member for Cape Breton South and Richmond, Nova Scotia.
 Gerry Byrne b. 1966 first elected in 1996 as Liberal member for Humber—St. Barbe—Baie Verte, Newfoundland and Labrador.
 James Allen Byrne b. 1911 first elected in 1949 as Liberal member for Kootenay East, British Columbia.

B